Edrich Lubbe may refer to:
 Edrich Lubbe (cricketer), born 1993, South African cricketer
 Edrich Lubbe (rugby union), born 1969, South African international rugby union player